Khuang Aphaiwong (also spelled Kuang, Abhaiwong, or Abhaiwongse; , ; 17 May 1902 – 15 March 1968), also known by his noble title Luang Kowit-aphaiwong, was three times the prime minister of Thailand: from August 1944 to 1945, from January to May 1946, and from November 1947 to April 1948.

Life and career 
Khuang was born in Battambang (a city in Cambodia), a son of the Siamese governor Chao Phraya Abhayabhubet. The Aphaiwongs were of royal Khmer lineage. Khuang attended Debsirin School and Assumption College, Bangkok, later studying engineering at the Ecole Centrale de Lyon in France. On his return to Thailand, he worked in the telegraph department, finally becoming director of the department. This earned him the feudal title Luang Kowit-aphaiwong. He married Lekha Kunadilok (Goone-Tilleke), daughter of Ceylon-born lawyer William Alfred Goone-Tilleke, founder of the law firm Tilleke & Gibbins.

Promoter of regime change and minister 
Khuang was a member of the civil faction of Khana Ratsadon ("People's Party"), the group that promoted the Siamese revolution of 1932, that brought a regime change from absolute to constitutional monarchy. Afterwards, he served as minister without portfolio in the cabinets of Phraya Phahon Phonphayuhasena and Plaek Phibunsongkhram (Phibun). During World War II he was commissioned a major and joined the King's Guard. As such he was at the head of the mission to Battambang which in July 1941 took control of the Cambodian territories occupied during the Franco-Thai War, to be renamed Phra Tabong Province. His father had been governor of part of this region before it was ceded to France 1907. Later he became minister of commerce and communications.

First term as prime minister 

On 1 August 1944, parliament elected him prime minister, after Phibun's plans to move the capital to Phetchabun and to create the Phutthamonthon Park failed to gain approval. He was a compromise candidate, standing between the Phibun supporters and the opposition Free Thai Movement. Ostensibly he co-operated with the Japanese who had occupied Thailand during the war. At the same time, he shielded the Free Thai who collaborated with the Allies. After the Japanese retreat he resigned on 31 August 1945, to make way for a new administration by the Free Thai forces.

Second term as prime minister 
In 1946 he was one of the founders of the conservative Democrat Party, and became its first leader. The fourth national elections on 6 January 1946 were won by the Democratic Party, which gained him a second term as prime minister starting on 31 January. Only 45 days later, on 24 March, his government lost a vote of no-confidence in parliament and he resigned.

Third term as prime minister and later life 
He became prime minister a third time on 10 November 1947 following a coup d'état led by Field Marshal Phin Chunhawan. However, the coup leaders were not pleased with the performance of Khuang's government and forced him to resign on 8 April 1948. This enabled Phibun to become prime minister again. Khuang continued in politics as the opposition leader and leader of the Democratic Party until all political parties were banned in 1958. His wife, Khunying Lekha Aphaiwong, was appointed senator in 1949, becoming one of the first female politicians of Thailand.

Khuang died on 15 March 1968, at age 66.

References

Further reading
 Goscha, Christopher E., Thailand and the Southeast Asian Networks of The Vietnamese Revolution, 1885-1954, Routledge, 1999, 

1902 births
1968 deaths
Khuang Aphaiwong
Khuang Aphaiwong
Khuang Aphaiwong
Khuang Aphaiwong
Khuang Aphaiwong
Khuang Aphaiwong
Khuang Aphaiwong
Khuang Aphaiwong
Khuang Aphaiwong
Khuang Aphaiwong
Khuang Aphaiwong
Khuang Aphaiwong
Khuang Aphaiwong
Khuang Aphaiwong
Khuang Aphaiwong
Khuang Aphaiwong
Khuang Aphaiwong
Khuang Aphaiwong
Khuang Aphaiwong
Khuang Aphaiwong
Khuang Aphaiwong
Khuang Aphaiwong
Leaders ousted by a coup